Giovanni Luigi or Giovanni Aloysius Mingarelli (1722-1791) was an Italian scholar in Greek language, who translated Greek and coptic religious texts, including the bible. One of his translations was Ægyptiorum Codicum Reliquiæ Venetiis In Bibliotheca Naniana Asservatæ, describing a text in the library of Giacomo Nani in Venice. He was born in Bologna, but taught Greek at the University of the Sapienza in Rome.

Works 

 Veterum Patrum latinorum opuscula nunquam antehac edita, Bologna, 1751.
 Anecdotorum fasciculus, sive S. Paulini Nolani, Anonymi scriptoris, Alani magni ac Theophylacti opuscula aliquot, nunc primum edita, etc., Rome, 1766.
 Epistola IV° sæculo conficta et a Basilio Magno sæpius commemorata, etc., in Nuova raccolta Calogerana, vol. 33.
 Sopra un’opera inedita d’un antico teologo, Lettera, etc., Venice, 1763.
 Græci codices manuscripti apud Nanios patricios Venetos asservati, Bologna, 1784.
 Ægyptiorum codicum reliquiæ Venetiis in Bibliotheca Naniana asservatæ, ibid., 1785, 2 voll.

References

External links 
 

1722 births
1791 deaths
18th-century Italian writers
18th-century Italian male writers
Italian philologists